Birch Creek is a stream in Franklin County in the U.S. state of Missouri. It is a tributary of the Bourbeuse River.

It crosses under US Route 50 just prior to its confluence with the Bourbeuse at  about five miles east of Union.

Birch Creek was named for the birch trees lining its course.

See also
List of rivers of Missouri

References

Rivers of Franklin County, Missouri
Rivers of Missouri